Windsor Historic District, or Windsor Village Historic District or variations, may refer to:

Windsor Square Historic District, Phoenix, AZ, listed on the NRHP in Arizona
 Windsor Village Historic Preservation Overlay Zone, Los Angeles, California
East Windsor Hill Historic District, South Windsor, CT, listed on the NRHP in Connecticut
Windsor Farms Historic District, South Windsor, CT, listed on the NRHP in Connecticut
Windsor Road Historic District, Newton, MA, listed on the NRHP in Massachusetts
Windsor Court Historic District, Southbridge, MA, listed on the NRHP in Massachusetts
Windsor Hills Historic District, Baltimore, MD, listed on the NRHP in Maryland
New Windsor Historic District, New Windsor, MD, listed on the NRHP in Maryland
 Windsor Historic District (Windsor, New Jersey), listed on the NRHP in New Jersey
Windsor Village Historic District (Windsor, New York), listed on the NRHP in New York
 Windsor Historic District (Windsor, North Carolina), listed on the NRHP in North Carolina
Windsor Village Historic District (Windsor, Vermont), listed on the NRHP in Vermont

See also
Windsor (disambiguation)